Suffolk Wildlife Trust (SWT) describes itself as the county's "nature charity – the only organisation dedicated wholly to safeguarding Suffolk's wildlife and countryside." It is a registered charity, and its headquarters is at Brooke House in Ashbocking, near Ipswich. It was founded in 1961, and is one of 46 wildlife trusts covering the Great Britain and Northern Ireland. As of March 2017, it has 13,200 members, and it manages  of land in 60 nature reserves, most of which are open to the public. It had an income of £3.9 million in the year to 31 March 2017.

Suffolk is a county in East Anglia. It is bounded by Norfolk to the north, Cambridgeshire to the west, Essex to the south and the North Sea to the east. The top level of local government is Suffolk County Council, and below it are five borough and district councils: Babergh, Ipswich, Mid Suffolk, East Suffolk, West Suffolk. Much of the coast consists of the estuaries of the Orwell, Stour, Alde, Deben and Blyth rivers, with large areas of wetlands and marshes. Agriculture and shipping play a major role in the county's economy.

The whole or part of nine SWT reserves are Ramsar internationally important wetland sites, thirty-one are Sites of Special Scientific Interest, four are national nature reserves, ten are Special Protection Areas, ten are Special Areas of Conservation, seven are Nature Conservation Review sites, one contains a scheduled monument and three are local nature reserves. One SWT reserve is in Dedham Vale, which is an Area of Outstanding Natural Beauty (AONB), and seven are in another AONB, Suffolk Coast and Heaths.

Key

Public access
No = no public access to site
FP = public access to footpaths through the site
PL = public access at limited times
PP = public access to part of site
Yes = public access to the whole or most of the site

Other classifications
DVAONB = Dedham Vale Area of Outstanding Natural Beauty
GCR = Geological Conservation Review
LNR = Local nature reserve

NCR = Nature Conservation Review
NNR = National nature reserve
NT = National Trust
Ramsar = Ramsar site, an internationally important wetland site
SAC = Special Area of Conservation
SCHAONB = Suffolk Coast and Heaths Area of Outstanding Natural Beauty
SM = Scheduled monument
SPA = Special Protection Area under the European Union Directive on the Conservation of Wild Birds
SSSI = Site of Special Scientific Interest

Sites

See also
List of Sites of Special Scientific Interest in Suffolk
National Nature Reserves in Suffolk
List of Local Nature Reserves in Suffolk

Notes

References

Sources

External links

Suffolk Wildlife Trust website

 
Charities based in Suffolk
Wildlife Trusts of England
1961 establishments in England